"Actinomyces actinomycetemcomitans" is a species in the genus Actinomyces.

References

Actinomycetales
Gram-positive bacteria
Bacteria described in 2001